Paul Ma Cunguo (born 1971) is a Chinese Roman Catholic Bishop of the Roman Catholic Diocese of Shuozhou since 2007.

Biography
Ma was born into a Catholic family in 1971. He was ordained a priest on March 23, 1996. He accepted the episcopacy with the papal mandate on February 8, 2004. On March 15, 2007, after the death of his predecessor Bonaventure Luo Juan, he became bishop of Roman Catholic Diocese of Shuozhou.

References

1971 births
Living people
21st-century Roman Catholic bishops in China